Miss Universe Latvia (Miss Universe Latvija) is a national Beauty pageant that selects the Latvian representative to the Miss Universe pageant. The contestants represent the 7 cities and 26 districts. There they would select the top 15, then the top 10 and the final 5. So far the pageant was held only thrice: 2005, 2006, and in 2022.

History
In 2005, Bravo Productions was awarded the rights to send Latvian representative to Miss Universe 2005 pageant to be held in Bangkok, Thailand. Ieva Kokoreviča became the first ever Miss Universe Latvia in an event held at the SAS Radisson in Riga on April 7, 2005. As well as having debuted, Latvia was also called out to the semi-finals (and finals) for the first time. The last Miss Universe Latvia is Sanita Kubliņa, who was crowned on April 5, 2006, in Riga. She represented Latvia in the Miss Universe 2006 competition in Los Angeles, California, but did not place. From 2007 up to 2021, Miss Universe Latvia did not compete in the Miss Universe pageant. The organization lost the franchise 12 years after the pageant was postponed. Began 2022, Inga Raduga Model Management under Inga Raduga directorship took over the license of Miss Universe pageant.

Miss Universe license holder in Latvia
 Bravo Production (2005-2006)
 Inga Raduga (2022—present)

Titleholders

The winner of Miss Universe Latvia represents the country at the Miss Universe pageant. On occasion, when the winner does not qualify (due to age) a runner-up is sent.

See also
Mis Latvija

References

External links
Official site of Miss Universe Latvia
Miss Universe Latvija 2005 Ieva Kokoreviča

Latvia
Beauty pageants in Latvia
Recurring events established in 2005
2005 establishments in Latvia
Latvian awards